Pinellas is the name of a peninsula located roughly halfway down the west coast of Florida. It forms the western boundary of Tampa Bay and comprises the bulk of Pinellas County. There is a city named Pinellas Park in south Pinellas. The peninsula is bounded on the north by Pasco County, Florida, on the northeast by Hillsborough County, and on the east and south by Tampa Bay. It is bounded on the west by the Intracoastal Waterway and the Gulf of Mexico. The Pinellas peninsula connects to the south with Manatee County via the Sunshine Skyway Bridge and connects with Hillsborough County on the east via the Courtney Campbell Causeway, the Howard Frankland Bridge, and the Gandy Bridge.

Overview 

The name derives from La Punta de Pinal de Jimenez ("Jimenez's Point of Pines"), the name given the entrance to Tampa Bay by Spanish explorers in 1757.  The first settlers in the area include Antonio Maximo Hernandez, the McMullen family and Odet Philippe. Maximo Point is the location of Maximo's fishing camp. McMullen's descendants still live in the area. Philippe Park, a Pinellas County park, and the Philippe Parkway were named for Philippe. Now highly urbanized, the peninsula was once renowned for its wildlife, including the American black bear, the Florida panther, and many species of birds.

Pinellas County is the most densely populated county in Florida. Its population is greater than that of the individual population of the states of Wyoming, Montana, Delaware, South Dakota, Alaska, North Dakota, or Vermont, and the District of Columbia.

There are 3,347 people per square mile in Pinellas County. The next closest county with a highly concentrated population is Broward with 1,445 people per square mile.

Landforms of Pinellas County, Florida
Geography of the Tampa Bay area
Peninsulas of Florida